was a  after Kyūju and before Heiji. This period spanned the years from April 1156 through April 1159.

Change of era
 January 24, 1156 : The new era name was created to mark an event or series of events. The previous era ended and a new one commenced in Kyūju 3, on the 24th day of the 4th month of 1156.

Events of the Hōgen era
 July 20, 1156 (Hōgen 1, 2nd day of the 7th month): Cloistered Emperor Toba-in died at age 54.
 July 28–August 16, 1156 (Hōgen 1, 10th-29th days of the 7th month): The Hōgen Rebellion, also known as the Hōgen Insurrection or the Hōgen War.
 1156 (Hōgen 1, 9th month): The naidaijin Fujiwara Saneyoshi was named sadaijin. The dainagon Fujiwara Koremichi became naidaijin.  After the war, tranquility was restored throughout the empire; and the emperor himself was in charge of the government. A special building was constructed in Kyoto, where—as in the days of Emperor Go-Sanjo, requests and complaints were received and examined.
 1157 (Hōgen 2, 8th month): Sanjō Saneyuki was dismissed from his position as daijō-daijin; and in the same month, the  sadaijin Saneyoshi died. The udaijin Fujiwara no Munesuke was made daijō-daijin. The naidaijin Koremichi was made sadaijin. Fujiwara no Moresane, who was the 15-year-old son of son of kampaku Fujiwara no Tadamichi, became udaijin. The dainagon Sanjō Kinori, who was the son of Saneyuki, obtained the position of naidaijin.
 1157 (Hōgen 2, 10th month): The foundations are laid for a grand audience hall (dairi) in the palace. There had not been such a structure within the palace compound since the time of Emperor Shirakawa.
 August 6, 1158 (Hōgen 3, 11th day of the 8th month): In the 3rd year of Go-Shirakawa's reign (後白河天皇25年), the emperor abdicated; and the succession (senso) was received by his eldest son.
 1158 (Hōgen 4, 8th month):  Emperor Nijō is said to have acceded to the throne (sokui).

Notes

References
 Brown, Delmer M. and Ichirō Ishida, eds. (1979).  Gukanshō: The Future and the Past. Berkeley: University of California Press. ;  OCLC 251325323
 Nussbaum, Louis-Frédéric and Käthe Roth. (2005).  Japan encyclopedia. Cambridge: Harvard University Press. ;  OCLC 58053128
 Titsingh, Isaac. (1834). Nihon Odai Ichiran; ou,  Annales des empereurs du Japon.  Paris: Royal Asiatic Society, Oriental Translation Fund of Great Britain and Ireland. OCLC 5850691
 Varley, H. Paul. (1980). A Chronicle of Gods and Sovereigns: Jinnō Shōtōki of Kitabatake Chikafusa. New York: Columbia University Press. ;  OCLC 6042764

External links
 National Diet Library, "The Japanese Calendar" -- historical overview plus illustrative images from library's collection

Japanese eras